The mace of the Senate of the Philippines is a ceremonial mace used as the symbol of authority in the Senate of the Philippines.

It represents the authority of the president of the Senate and also the authority of the sergeant-at-arms when enforcing order in the institution. It is considered a significant part of the Senate's regalia and is a symbol of the institution being properly constituted. When the Senate is in session, where it is displayed at the Senate president's rostrum. If the Senate is not in session, it is kept under the custody of the sergeant-at-arms.

The sergeant-at-arms, is designated as custodian of the mace. At certain occasions such as disorder in the session hall, the official shall lift the mace from its pedestal and present it before an unruly member in order to restore order or quell boisterous behavior in the chamber.

Description 
The design of the mace consists of a wooden staff with the Senate's seal on the top. Similar with the mace of the House of Representatives, the Senate maces used during the 1st to 7th Congresses used the Coat of Arms of the Philippines.

See also 
 Mace of the House of Representatives of the Philippines

References

Senate of the Philippines
Ceremonial weapons
Philippine Senate